Glasberg or Glassberg is a Jewish surname originating from the German words glas (glass) and berg (mountain). Notable people with the surname include:
Ben Glassberg (born 1994), British music conductor
Gary Glasberg (1964/65–2016), American television writer and producer
Irving Glassberg (1906–1958), Polish-American cinematographer
Jeffrey Glassberg (born 1947), American biologist and author
Lauren Glassberg (born 1970), American journalist
Lisa Glasberg (born 1956), better known as Lisa G, is an American radio news personality

References